The Schillinger System of Musical Composition, named after Joseph Schillinger (1895–1943) is a method of musical composition based on mathematical processes. It comprises theories of rhythm, harmony, melody, counterpoint, form and semantics, purporting to offer a systematic and non-genre approach to music analysis and composition; a descriptive rather than prescriptive grammar of music.

While it influenced some prominent figures, such as Lawrence Berk (founder of the Berklee College of Music) and George Gershwin (likely influencing the piece "I Got Rhythm Variations"), it began to fall out of favor in the 1960s after receiving criticisms for being over-complicated and pseudo-scientific, and was removed from the Berklee curriculum.

Schillinger's career

Schillinger was a professor at The New School in New York City and taught such musicians as George Gershwin, Glenn Miller,  Benny Goodman, and other Hollywood and Broadway composers.

After Schillinger

Schillinger's celebrity status made him suspect, and his ideas were treated with skepticism. He died early from stomach cancer. He did not finish work on the texts he hoped would advance his theories in the realm of academe. His widow and biographer, Frances Schillinger, hired editors to complete and publish a text. They pulled together his unfinished monograph with parts of his correspondence courses. Despite its length, it presents only a partial exposition of the system. For example, Schillinger's theory of counterpoint covers only two-part counterpoint. It is marred by a wildly uneven tone, at times neutral and objective, at times vehement and polemical. His method remained difficult and obscure for the uninitiated.

His flamboyant manner based on extreme assertions is evident in his writings: "These procedures were performed crudely by even well-reputed composers. For example L. van Beethoven…"

Later, in The Theory of Melody, Beethoven is taken to task over the construction of the opening melody of his Pathétique Sonata.

Beyond style

Schillinger's System of Musical Composition is an attempt to create a comprehensive and definitive treatise on music and number. This has the disadvantage of resulting in a treatise of great length and elaborate nomenclature. By revealing principles of the organization of sound through scientific analysis, Schillinger hoped to free the composer from the shackles of tradition. Although the system is forward-looking, couched in an apparently modern form, it also clarifies traditional music theory by debunking misconceptions from the past.
 He was clear that his methods allowed any style of composition to be undertaken more effectively.

 
Schillinger rarely attempts to predict the aesthetic consequences of his system, but instead offers generalized pattern-making techniques, free of stylistic bias.

Scope and limitations

The positive side of the balance sheet reads this way:

All existing music is accommodated.
Techniques do not prohibit creative freedom.
Results are practical and effective.

The thesis underlying Schillinger's research is that music is a form of movement. Any physical action or process has its equivalent form of expression in music. Both movement and music are understandable with our existing knowledge of science. His contribution was intuitively recognizing how to apply everyday mathematics to the making of music. He expressed the belief that certain patterns were universal, and common to both music and the very structure of our nervous system.

Schillinger's style can induce a resistance, appearing at times relentlessly dry, favoring algebra and music notation above words. Occasionally the text is deliberately provocative. The techniques are tools: by themselves, they do not compose music but merely assist the composer in the planning and execution of large musical structures. The techniques in the field of rhythm to some extent compensate for an imbalance in composition literature, largely dominated by considerations of pitch.

Many of the techniques and procedures were later independently advocated by others, whom history remembers as their creators. Furthermore, Schillinger pioneered advanced algorithmic compositional techniques long before the work of Iannis Xenakis and other later advocates.

The uncompromising tone is due partly to the background from which he emerged. During the 1930s, he was amongst those who called for science to sweep away outdated practices.

Students
For all its rigour, repetition and challenge, the System was enjoyed and apparently used with great success for many years after its author's death. Schillinger’s influence lingers on in the work of celebrated musicians as well as those who produced countless film scores and television theme tunes.

Schillinger had a profound effect on the world of jazz education. One of Schillinger's recognised students, Lawrence Berk, founded the Schillinger House of Music in Boston, after Schillinger's death, to continue the dissemination of the System. Schillinger House opened in 1945 and later became the Berklee College of Music where the Schillinger System survived in the curriculum until the 1960s. See: Berklee method.

In the 1940s, the Schillinger Method was a focus of the curriculum at Westlake College of Music. Dick Grove, who was one of the teachers at Westlake and had studied the Schillinger System for 9 years, developed some of Schillinger's ideas into his own comprehensive system of music education, which he taught at his Grove School of Music and later at the Grove School Without Walls. 
 
Noted jazz swing composer Edgar Sampson ("Stompin' at the Savoy") was a Schillinger student in the 1940s.

Yet another admirer and former student of Schillinger's system was veteran movie composer, John Barry. ("John Barry - A Sixties Theme" by Eddi Fiegel (Constable, London, 1998)).

External links
The Schillinger Society
The Practical Schillinger Online School
Practical Schillinger Facebook
The Schillinger Society Blog
 Example of the Schillinger system
 Pease, Ted, "The Schillinger/Berklee Connection: A perusal of Lawrence Berk's notebooks sheds light on Berklee's early curriculum", Berklee Today, Berklee College of Music, Boston. Article on the practical use of the Schillinger System, with examples
 Schillinger-based software

References

Post-tonal music theory